Harold Newhart (July 19, 1903 – March 31, 1977) was an American gymnast. He competed in seven events at the 1928 Summer Olympics.

References

1903 births
1977 deaths
American male artistic gymnasts
Olympic gymnasts of the United States
Gymnasts at the 1928 Summer Olympics
Sportspeople from Parkersburg, West Virginia